USS Potomac or USNS Potomac may refer to one of these United States Navy ships:

 , a frigate in commission from 1831 to 1877
 , a whaler purchased in 1861 and sunk as part of the "Stone Fleet" in 1862
 , a tug in commission from 1898 to 1922
 , a presidential yacht in service from 1936 to 1945
 , an oiler in service from 1957 until destroyed in a fire in 1961
 , an oiler in service from 1976 to 1983

United States Navy ship names